Hongxi (20 January 1425 – 7 February 1426) was the era name of the Hongxi Emperor, the fourth emperor of the Ming dynasty of China, and was used for one year. In June 1425 (Hongxi 1, 6th month), the Xuande Emperor ascended to the throne and continued to use. The era was changed to Xuande in the following year.

Change of era
 20 January 1425 (Yongle 23, 1st day of the 1st month): The era was changed to Hongxi 1 (洪熙元年, "the first year of the Hongxi era").
 8 February 1426 (Hongxi 2, 1st day of the 1st month): The era was changed to Xuande 1 (宣德元年, "the first year of the Xuande era").

Comparison table
The Gānzhī of each month on the right side of the table was the first day of each month. "(Long)" means that the month has 30 days, and "(Short)" means that the month has 29 days. The numbers in the "leap month" table indicate the X leap month of that year, and the numbers below the first day of each month indicate the corresponding Western calendar date.

Other regime era names that existed during the same period
Japan
 Ōei (応永, 1394–1428): era name of Emperor Go-Komatsu and Emperor Shōkō

See also
 List of Chinese era names
 List of Ming dynasty era names

References

Further reading

Ming dynasty eras